Peter Maitland Corroon (born July 16, 1964) is an American politician, former Utah Democratic Party chair, and the former mayor of Salt Lake County, Utah. He was the unsuccessful Democratic nominee for governor in the 2010 election. Corroon is a first cousin to Howard Dean, former Vermont governor and former head of the Democratic National Committee.

Early life, education and career
Corroon graduated from Carnegie-Mellon University with a bachelor's degree in civil engineering in 1986.  He obtained a Juris Doctor degree from Golden Gate University School of Law and a master's from New York University in real estate. For a time, Corroon ran a small development company.

Political career

In November 2008, Corroon was re-elected to a second term as Salt Lake County Mayor over Republican challenger Michael Renckert with 66% of the vote. In January 2010, Corroon announced his candidacy for governor of the state of Utah to challenge incumbent Republican Gary Herbert. In May, he announced his running mate would be Republican State Representative Sheryl Allen. Despite their eventual defeat in the 2010 Election, they were the first "bipartisan" gubernatorial ticket in Utah history.

In addition to being mayor of Salt Lake County, Corroon also serves as a board member for the National Association of Counties, the United Way, the Economic Development Corporation of Utah, the Utah Technology Council and the Utah State Board of Tourism.

References

External links
Salt Lake County Mayor Peter Corroon official government site

|-

1964 births
Carnegie Mellon University College of Engineering alumni
Golden Gate University School of Law alumni
Living people
Mayors of Salt Lake County, Utah
New York University alumni
People from Greenwich, Connecticut
State political party chairs of Utah
Utah Democrats